Pavlo Fedosov (born 14 August 1996) is a Ukrainian professional footballer who plays as a striker for Chernihiv.

Career
Fedosov is a product of Yunist Chernihiv Youth Sportive School, joining at age 6.

Sumy
In 2016 he moved to  Sumy in the Ukrainian First League.

Arsenal Kyiv
In August 2017 he signed a contract with club FC Arsenal Kyiv in the Ukrainian First League.

Nyva Vinnytsia
In 2018 he moved to Nyva Vinnytsia.

Balkany Zorya
In 2021 he moved to Balkany Zorya.

Personal Life
His mother, Tetyana Fedosova, is a retired footballer who played for Lehenda Chernihiv.

Career statistics

Club

Honours
Arsenal Kyiv
 Ukrainian First League: 2017–18

Riga
 Latvian Cup: Runner-Up 2016–17

References

External links

1996 births
Living people
Footballers from Chernihiv
Ukrainian footballers
FC Yunist Chernihiv players
FC Chernihiv players
FC Arsenal-Kyivshchyna Bila Tserkva players
PFC Sumy players
Riga FC players
FC Arsenal Kyiv players
FC Ahrobiznes Volochysk players
FC Nyva Vinnytsia players
FC Avanhard Koriukivka players
FC Balkany Zorya players
Ukrainian First League players
Ukrainian Second League players
Latvian Higher League players
Ukrainian expatriate footballers
Expatriate footballers in Latvia
Ukrainian expatriate sportspeople in Latvia
Association football forwards